Treasure Chest is a 3 disc box set by the German power metal group Helloween.

Originally seen as quite the collection for fans/collectors worldwide the box consists 2 discs compiling (and remastering) some of their finest works of their 1985-2000 albums as well as a third (bonus disc) featuring many rare b'sides from the band's past singles.  However, since the 2006 remastering and expansion of most of Helloween's back catalogue, featuring all of the tracks here (plus much more), this box is now seen mainly as a collector's piece.

Track listing

CD 1

CD 2

CD 3
(Buried Treasure, bonus CD)

Credits
Andi Deris - vocals   (CD1: track 1-4, CD2: track 5-14, CD3: track 6-8, 10, 11)
Michael Kiske - vocals   (CD1: track 5,6,9,12-15 CD2: track 1-4, CD3: track 1, 3, 4)
Kai Hansen - vocals  (CD1: track 7-8,10-11) guitar, background vocals   (CD1: track 5-15, CD2: track 1, 2)
Michael Weikath - guitar   (CD1: all tracks, CD2: all tracks, CD3: 1-4, 6-11)
Roland Grapow - guitar   (CD1: track 1-4, CD2: track 3-14, CD3: all tracks 
Markus Grosskopf - bass   (CD1: all tracks, CD2: all tracks, CD3: 1-4, 6-11)
Uli Kusch - drums   (CD1: track 1-4, CD2: track 5-14, CD3: track 5-11)
Ingo Schwichtenberg - drums   (CD1: track 5-15, CD2: track 1-4, CD3: track 1-4)

Charts

References

Helloween compilation albums
2002 compilation albums